Boľkovce (or )   is a village and municipality in the Lučenec District in the Banská Bystrica Region of Slovakia.

History
In historical records, the village was first mentioned in 1320 and 1435 as Bolk (1467 Bwlyk, 1481 Bolyk). In 1481, it belonged to Divín Castle lords and later on to the Somoskő lords. In the mid-16th century it was occupied and destroyed by the Ottoman Turks, from 1938 to 1945 by Hungary.

Genealogical resources
The records for genealogical research are available at the state archive "Statny Archiv in Banska Bystrica, Slovakia"

 Roman Catholic church records (births/marriages/deaths): 1802-1895 (parish A)
 Lutheran church records (births/marriages/deaths): 1783-1895 (parish B)

See also
 List of municipalities and towns in Slovakia

External links
 
 
https://web.archive.org/web/20070513023228/http://www.statistics.sk/mosmis/eng/run.html
Surnames of living people in Bolkovce

Villages and municipalities in Lučenec District